Chitra Pournami is a 1976 Indian Tamil-language film, directed by P. Madhavan and written by Balamurugan. The film stars Sivaji Ganesan, Jayalalithaa, R. Muthuraman and C. R. Vijayakumari. It was released on 22 October 1976.

Plot 

Sengodan's parents are murdered by their zamindar and his sister gets separated from him on Chitra Pournami day. He vows vengeance on the same day and attempts to take the zamindar's life every year on that day. Several years later, he plans to kill the zamindar, but is shocked upon realising that his sister is now the landlord's cherished and beloved daughter-in-law leading a peaceful life. 

Sengodan falls in love with the zamindar's daughter and marries her. He now has to decide which is greater: revenge or his present relations. Though he keeps tilting towards vengeance and the zamindar continues in different ways to get rid of him manipulating his relationship with his daughter as well as his daughter-in-law, he slowly softens. When the climatic moment arrived where the zamindar's life is in his hands, he hears his child crying upon being birthed, changes his mind and lets the zamindar live as he does not want his child to suffer they way he did without a father.

Cast 
Sivaji Ganesan as Sengodan
Jayalalithaa as Rani
C. R. Vijayakumari as Vijaya/Durga
R. Muthuraman as Kumar
Major Sundarrajan as Vaithiyar
R. S. Manohar as the zamindar
Nagesh as Chinnamalai Jameendar
Jayakumari as Ramba
Senthamarai as Kadamban
Heran Ramasamy as Bairava

Production 
Chitra Pournami was directed by P. Madhavan, written by Balamurugan, and produced by R. M. Subramaniyan, K. R. Srinivasan and N. Naga Subramaniyan under Sri Bhuvaneswari Movies. Cinematography was handled by P. N. Sundaram, and the editing by R. Devarajan. P. A. Saleem worked as the choreographer, and the film's final cut measured . Another film with the same title began production in the mid-1960s before being shelved.

Soundtrack 
The music was composed by M. S. Viswanathan, and the songs were written by Kannadasan.

References

External links 
 

1970s Tamil-language films
1976 films
Films scored by M. S. Viswanathan
Films directed by P. Madhavan